The 229th Battalion, CEF was a unit in the Canadian Expeditionary Force during the First World War.  Based in Moose Jaw, Saskatchewan, the unit began recruiting in early 1916 in southern Saskatchewan.  After sailing to England in April 1917, the battalion was absorbed into the 19th Reserve Battalion on May 10, 1917.  The 229th Battalion, CEF had one Officer Commanding: Lieut-Col. H. D. Pickett.

References
Meek, John F. Over the Top! The Canadian Infantry in the First World War. Orangeville, Ont.: The Author, 1971.

Battalions of the Canadian Expeditionary Force
Moose Jaw